Twenty eight may refer to:
 the number 28
 Twenty-eight parrot (Barnardius zonarius semitorquatus), a subspecies of the Australian ringneck parrot of Western Australia
 Twenty-eight, a card game
 Twenty Eight (song), a song by Canadian recording artist The Weeknd